Galatia may refer to:

 Galatia, an ancient region of Asia Minor
 Galatia (Roman province), a province of the Roman empire
 Galatia, Cyprus
 Galatia, Illinois, United States
 Galatia, Kansas, United States
 Galatia, Kozani, Greece
 Galatia, Turkey

See also
 Galatea (disambiguation)
 Galicia (disambiguation)
 Galatasaray (disambiguation)
 Galata, neighbourhood in the Beyoğlu district of Istanbul, Turkey